Wasick is a surname. Notable people with the surname include:

Joanna Wasick, American voice actress and associate attorney
Katarzyna Wasick (born 1992), Polish swimmer